Daff Dome or DAFF Dome is a prominent  granite dome in Yosemite National Park,  west of Tuolumne Meadows and  from the Tioga Road. It is southeast of Doda Dome, and is near both West Cottage Dome and East Cottage Dome; it is also near Lamb Dome. Since the dome was never officially named, the DAFF Dome name was adopted in the 1960s as an acronym of "Dome Across From Fairview" Dome.

Climbing
The dome is popular with rock climbers and has several multi-pitch slab and  crack climbs. Two of the earliest and best known are West Crack and Crescent Arch. West Crack, first climbed by Frank Sacherer in June 1963 is a 5 pitch YDS 5.9 which for 400 feet follows a continuous crack. Crescent Arch was first climbed with occasional aid by Layton Kor and Fred Beckey in June 1965, and first free climbed by Bob Kamps and TM Herbert soon after. The climb is a 6 pitch YDS 5.9+ (modern 5.10a)  and ascends corner and crack system in a large open book.

References

Granite domes of Yosemite National Park
Landforms of Tuolumne County, California